The 18567 / 18568 Kollam–Visakhapatnam Express is a weekly express train runs between Kollam Junction in Kerala and Visakhapatnam Junction in Andhra Pradesh.

History
Visakhapatnam is a place where Malayalis are very high in number. A train between Visakhapatnam and Kollam (Quilon or Coulão), the erstwhile commercial capital of Malabar Coast, was a long-standing demand from the Malayali communities in Andhra Pradesh. As a result, Indian Railways have started a permanent service between Kollam and Visakhapatnam on 30 January 2014. Railway used to run special train services between Kollam and Visakhapatnam every year.

Background

Route & Halts
Kollam Junction → Sasthamkotta → Karunagappally → Kayamkulam → Mavelikara → Chengannur → Tiruvalla → Changanassery → Kottayam → Ernakulam Town → Aluva → Thrissur → Palakkad Junction → Coimbatore Junction → Tiruppur → Erode Junction → Salem Junction → Jolarpettai Junction → Katpadi Junction → Renigunta Junction → Gudur Junction → Nellore → Singarayakonda → Ongole → Bapatla → Tenali Junction → Vijayawada Junction → Eluru → Rajahmundry → Samalkot → Elamanchili → Duvvada → Visakhapatnam Junction

Coach composition
 2 AC III tier
 13 sleeper class
 6 general compartments
 2 SLR compartments

See also
 Kollam–Thiruvananthapuram trunk line
 Shoranur–Cochin Harbour section
 Anantapuri Express
 Palaruvi Express

References

External links

Express trains in India
Rail transport in Kerala
Rail transport in Kollam
Railway services introduced in 2014
Rail transport in Andhra Pradesh
Rail transport in Tamil Nadu
Transport in Visakhapatnam